Wat Tyler (c. 1320/4 January 1341 – 15 June 1381) was a leader of the 1381 Peasants' Revolt in England. He led a group of rebels from Canterbury to London to oppose the institution of a poll tax and to demand economic and social reforms. While the brief rebellion enjoyed early success, Tyler was killed by officers loyal to King Richard II during negotiations at Smithfield, London.

Early life
Not much is known of Wat Tyler's early life. There are varying sources of his birth. One claims that he was born on 4 January 1341, while another source claims he was born around 1320. Most historians agree that he was born around 1341. He was fascinated by John Ball, his group having broken the radical priest out of jail. He was probably born in Kent or Essex. “Wat” may have been his given name (derived from the Old English name Watt), or a diminutive form of the name Walter; his original surname was unknown. It is thought that the name "Tyler" came from his occupation as a roof tiler, but this is not confirmed. Prior to the Peasants' Revolt, it is probable that he lived in Kent or Essex; he has variously been represented as coming from Dartford and Maidstone in Kent, from Deptford, which was in Kent at the time, and from Colchester in Essex.

Peasants' Revolt

The Peasants' Revolt began in May 1381, triggered by a recently imposed poll tax of 4 pence from every adult, whether peasant or wealthy. The revolt was not only about money, as the peasants also sought increased liberty and other social reforms. They demanded that each labourer be allowed to work for the employer of his choice and sought an end to serfdom and other rigid social demarcation. There were uprisings across England, with much of the unrest focused on Essex and Kent. The uprising was opposed by a significant part of English society in those regions, including nobility and wealthy religious establishments. Many peasants and labourers were inspired by the teachings of John Ball, a radical priest who preached that all humans should be treated equally, as descendants of Adam and Eve, and who asked: "When Adam delved and Eve span/Who was then the gentleman?"

How Tyler became involved with the revolt is unknown, although a much later16th-century source indicates that a man of a similar name, John Tyler, was its initiator. This account suggests that a poll-tax collector had indecently assaulted John Tyler's daughter. It is suggested the poll tax collector "pulled up his daughter's clothes to see if she arrived at the age of puberty". In revenge he killed the miscreant and triggered the insurgency. Regardless of the basis of that story, by June 1381, when groups of rebels from across the country began a coordinated assault on London, Wat Tyler had emerged as a leader of the Kentish forces.

On 13 June, the rebels reached the capital and crossed London Bridge. Once in the city, they attacked civil targets, destroying legal records, opening prisons, sacking homes, and killing individuals they thought were associated with the royal government. In response, the king, Richard II (then 14 years old), met with the rebels on 14 June 1381 and agreed to make many concessions and to give full pardons to all those involved in the rebellion. While some of the rebels were satisfied by the king's promises and dispersed, Tyler and his followers were not.

Death

On 15 June 1381, Tyler and his Kentish forces met King Richard at Smithfield, outside London. There, Tyler spoke personally with the king and put forward his demands. At first, the meeting seems to have gone well, with Tyler treating the king in a friendly, if overly familiar, manner, and Richard agreeing the rebels "should have all that he could fairly grant".

However, tensions quickly rose. According to a contemporary chronicler, Tyler acted contemptuously, calling for a flagon of water to rinse his mouth "because of the great heat that he was in" and when he received the water "he rinsed his mouth in a very rude and disgusting fashion before the King's face". Sir John Newton (a servant of the king) insulted Tyler by calling him "the greatest thief and robber in all Kent". Tyler attacked Newton, but was restrained and arrested by the Lord Mayor of London, William Walworth. Tyler then attempted to stab the mayor, who was saved by his armour. Walworth slashed Tyler across the neck and head with his sword, and another of the king's servants, possibly Ralph de Standish, stabbed Tyler again, severely wounding him. Tyler managed to ride thirty yards before he fell from his horse.

In the disorder that followed, he was taken to a hospital for the poor, but was tracked down by the mayor, brought back to Smithfield and publicly decapitated. Tyler's head was placed atop a pole and carried through the city, then displayed on London Bridge. In the wake of their leader's death, his followers were driven from London and the movement was shattered. Subsequently, Richard II revoked all the concessions he had made to the rebels and many were hunted down and executed. That effectively ended the revolt.

In popular culture
John Gower commented on Wat Tyler in his 14th-century poem Vox Clamantis: "The jay's voice is wild and he has only learnt the art of speaking from the classes with whom the Latin poet is identified." A number of works in the post-medieval period have featured Wat Tyler as protagonist. Tyler was the protagonist of the play Wat Tyler and Jack Straw, or, The Mob Reformers (1730) first performed at Bartholomew Fair in 1730. Wat Tyler is represented in Robert Southey's Wat Tyler, A Dramatic Poem, which was written in 1794 but not published until 1813. 

The first novel to feature Wat Tyler is Mrs O'Neill's The Bondman: A Story of the Days of Wat Tyler (1833). He is the protagonist in Pierce Egan the Younger's novel Wat Tyler, or the Rebellion of 1381 (1841), a highly radical text published at the height of the second phase of the Chartist movement that argued for republican government in England. Egan's novel was subsequently abridged and plagiarised and published as The Life and Adventures of Wat Tyler: The Good and the Brave (1851). Wat Tyler is the protagonist of the penny dreadful serial novel Wat Tyler; or, The King and the Apprentice which appeared in weekly parts in The Young Englishman's Journal in 1867, and appears as a main character in William Harrison Ainsworth's Merry England; or, Nobles and Serfs (1874). In Charles Dickens' Bleak House (1853), his name is invoked by Sir Leicester Dedlock as an example of what would happen if any concessions were made to "some person in the lower classes". Tyler features as a sympathetic hero in the novel A Dream of John Ball (1888) by William Morris. 

Wat Tyler is also mentioned in Redburn by Herman Melville and in A Connecticut Yankee in King Arthur's Court by Mark Twain. Tyler features briefly in the historical fiction The Mediation of Ralph Hardelot (1888) by William Minto. The juvenile novel A March on London (1897) by G. A. Henty, depicts Tyler briefly as a "sullen and resentful" demagogue. Henty's book was illustrated by W.H. Margetson. Long Will (1903), a novel by Florence Converse, depicts a meritorious Wat Tyler. 

The 1921 play Wat Tyler by Halcott Glover interprets Tyler as a sympathetic protester against feudal tyranny, who is driven into violence by John Ball's preaching. Riot at Gravesend (1952), a novel by William Howard Woods, focus on the combats between the rebels and the authorities. Who Then Was The Gentleman? (1963) is a novel by Charles E. Israel, that renders a courageous and charismatic Wat Tyler. A Summer Storm (1976), a novel by Jane Lane, depicts Tyler as a villain. The novel The Confession of Jack Straw (1991) by Simone Zelitch features Tyler as a central character. The children's novel Fire, Bed, and Bone (1997) by Henrietta Branford has Wat Tyler as one of its characters. Wat Tyler is the principal character in the historical novel, Now is the Time (2015) by Melvyn Bragg.

English composer Alan Bush wrote an opera, Wat Tyler, about Tyler's life. Bush's opera was premiered at the Leipzig Opera in 1953.

Singer-songwriter Martin Newell references Wat Tyler and the Peasant's Revolt in his song "The Jangling Man" from the 1990 album Number Thirteen, in reference to the poll tax riots.

English folk singer-songwriter Frank Turner references Wat Tyler's negotiations at Smithfield in "Sons of Liberty" from the 2009 album Poetry of the Deed, and again mentions Tyler by name in "One Foot Before the Other" from 2011 album England Keep My Bones.

Provisional IRA member and Irish political prisoner Bobby Sands referenced "Wat the Tyler" and his poor in one of his wider-known poems written while in prison, "The Rhythm of Time".

A cultural history survey of Wat Tyler's portrayals in post-medieval literature down to the modern period has been written by Stephen Basdeo who argues that most of Tyler's appropriations in popular culture appear at times of political excitement.

Tributes
A section of the A249 road passing through Maidstone is named "Wat Tyler Way" in his honour.

"Tyler's Causeway" running from Newgatestreet Village towards the A1000 in Hertfordshire named for the route taken by some of his followers fleeing the capital following his death.

A road on the western edge of Blackheath is called Wat Tyler Road

Wat Tyler Country Park in Essex is named after him.

Swindon Borough Council's Offices are in Wat Tyler House.

A memorial commemorating Wat Tyler and the Great Rising of 1381 was unveiled on 15 July 2015 in Smithfield, London.

See also
 John Ball and Jack Straw, co-leaders of the 1381 Peasants' Revolt
 Jack Cade, leader of the 1450 Kentish Revolt
 Michael An Gof, leader of the Cornish rebellion of 1497
 Robert Kett, leader of Kett's Rebellion in 1549 in Norfolk
 Bartholomew Steer, leader of the 1596 Oxfordshire Rebellion
 King Richard II of England

References

External links

 Wat Tyler Country Park
 Wat Tyler on historyguide.org – a description, from a chronicle of the time, which relates the final meeting between Wat Tyler and King Richard II.
 Wat Tyler's Rebellion in Froissart chronicle. – excerpts, from a Full 12 volume edition of Froissart chronicle related to Wat Tyler's Rebellion.
 EASF radical history wiki An East Anglia-specific look at the rebellion
 The Peasants' Revolt, BBC Radio 4 discussion with Miri Rubin, Caroline Barron & Alastair Dunn (In Our Time, Nov. 16, 2006)
 

Year of birth unknown
14th-century births
1381 deaths
Place of birth unknown
English rebels
English revolutionaries
English tax resisters
Medieval Kent
Peasants' Revolt
People from Kent
Year of birth uncertain